Cynthia Hedge-Morrell (born September 4, 1947) is an African-American teacher, a former school administrator, and a Democratic politician from New Orleans, Louisiana. She served on the New Orleans City Council from 2005 to 2014.

Education
Hedge-Morrell holds a Bachelor of Administration in Elementary Education from the University of New Orleans and a Master of Science from Loyola University New Orleans.

Political life
Hedge-Morrell was elected to New Orleans City Council in a special election on April 2, 2005. Hedge-Morrell instead defeated a Republican candidate, Eustis J. Guillemet, Jr. (born January 1934), 4,959 votes (84.5 percent) to 912 (15.5 percent). Hedge-Morrell was re-elected in 2006 but with a reduced majority. A number of her colleagues faced voter dissatisfaction stemming from the aftermath of Hurricane Katrina. Mayor Ray Nagin won re-election only after facing a much tougher challenge than expected before the hurricane and half of the members who wished to stay were not returned to the city council.

In 2007, Hedge-Morrell faced a political scandal when she was pulled over by Louisiana State Police for driving 100 mph on Interstate 10. She yelled at the state trooper, "Do you know who I am? ... What the hell are you stopping me for?" She later apologized for the incident.

She appeared in the documentary political film directed by Leslie Carde America Betrayed (2008).

In 2014, Hedge-Morrell was term-limited in her District D council seat and instead ran unsuccessfully for the Division 2 at-large seat. She was defeated by a two-to-one margin by her fellow Democrat, Jason Williams.

Personal life
Since 1966, Hedge-Morrell has been married to Arthur A. Morrell, who served as a state representative for District 97 from 1984 to 2006, when he was elected as the Orleans Parish Clerk of Criminal Court. District 97 roughly covers the same area as District D. Hedge-Morrell and her husband were among the participants in movie director Spike Lee's documentary When The Levees Broke: A Requiem In Four Acts.

Morrell is Catholic.

Election history
Councilmember, District D, 2005
Threshold > 50%
First Ballot, April 2, 2005

Councilmember, District D, 2006
Threshold > 50%
First Ballot, April 22, 2006

Notes

Sources
City of New Orleans website
Louisiana Secretary of State website
Hedge-Morrell's re-election website archived at Wayback Machine

1947 births
Living people
New Orleans City Council members
Place of birth missing (living people)
Louisiana Democrats
University of New Orleans alumni
Loyola University New Orleans alumni
Women city councillors in Louisiana
Educators from Louisiana
American women educators
21st-century American women
African-American Catholics